The Institut für Meereskunde (IfM, Institute of Marine Sciences) in Kiel, Germany, existed from April 1, 1937 to January 1, 2004. It was an essential element of the long history of marine sciences in Kiel. This history started with the work of Samuel Reyher published in 1697 and is today continued within the GEOMAR Helmholtz Centre for Ocean Research Kiel.

Early history

Early work in physical/chemical oceanography started with Samuel Reyher, professor at the Christian Albrecht [University of Kiel] (CAU), when he published his investigation on salinity in the ice-covered Kiel Fjord in 1697. Other professors of Kiel University followed with work on marine topics. Johann Nikolaus Tetens (1736-1807) studied tides of the North Sea, Christoph Heinrich Pfaff (1773-1852) studied hydrographic and chemical conditions in the western Baltic Sea, and Gustav Adolf Michaelis (1798-1848) discussed optical effects in the sea.

Systematic marine research, however, began only later during the 19th century with biological studies, most notably by the zoologist Karl August Möbius (1825-1908), the physiologist Victor Hensen (1835-1924), the marine production biologist Karl Brandt (1854-1931), and the zoologist Wilhelm Friedrich Georg Behn (1808-1878) who participated in the first of the Danish Galathea expeditions (1845-1847). Expeditions in the Baltic and North Seas were performed with Kiel scientists, with S.M.Aviso-Steamer Pommerania (1871, 1872)  and later with the freight-steamer Holsatia (1887, 1901/02). The S.M.S. Gazelle of the German Navy Hydrographic Office started from Kiel on an expedition (1874-1876) around the globe. In Montevideo there was an encounter with the simultaneous Challenger Expedition (1872-1876), with some coordination of stations. The Kiel oceanographer Gustav Karsten published the results from the physical measurements of the Gazelle cruise in 1888. The Plankton-Expedition in the Atlantic Ocean on the ’’National’’ in 1889 was the beginning of deep-sea expeditions carried out by Kiel scientists.

Systematic physical and chemical marine studies also started during the second half of the 19th century. Two people need to be acknowledged in particular. The merchant and industrialist Heinrich Adolph Meyer (1822-1889) from Hamburg managed to  convene a group united by marine research interests. The physicist Gustav Karsten (1820-1900) from Kiel belonged to this group. A long-term cooperation developed among these two people. Beginning in 1859, Meyer carried out first hydrographic observations in Kiel Fjord and started systematic measurements for the investigation of seasonal changes in the Baltic Sea. Meyer received his honorary doctor from Kiel University in 1866.

A major step was the establishment of the “Prussian Commission for the Scientific Investigation of German Seas in Kiel“ (also called the Kiel Commission; in German: Preußische Kommission zur wissenschaftlichen Untersuchung der deutschen Meere in Kiel). Meyer was a founding member and held the first chair until 1880, with Karsten being his successor until 1896. Möbius and Hensen were also members of the commission. The main objective was the improvement of fisheries. But it became evident soon that this goal could not be reached without an improved knowledge of the hydrography and the development of new approaches and methods. Subsequently the Kiel Commission played an important role in the development of marine sciences in Germany. A "Laboratory for international marine science" (in German: "Laboratorium für die internationale Meeresforschung") was established by the Commission in 1902. Furthermore, the geographer Otto Krümmel became professor at Kiel University in 1883, strengthening hydrographic work. He wrote the first textbook (2 volumes) on oceanography in German language. The Institute of Zoology and Zoological Museum of Kiel University became the center of marine biological research, led by Adolf Remane (1898-1976) from 1924 to 1934. In addition, Kiel was the home of outstanding scientists and engineers in marine acoustics as part of industry and navy, in particular Alexander Behm (1880-1952), Hugo Lichte (1891-1963) and Karl Heinrich Hecht (1880-1961).

Institut für Meereskunde

The University of Kiel decided to concentrate marine sciences within an institution of the university, and the Institut für Meereskunde (IfM) was founded in 1937. Activities of the former laboratories of the Kiel Commission were included in the new institution. The institute had three departments: Biology, Hydrography and Chemistry, and Geology. In addition to disciplinary work, interdisciplinary approaches took root. Studies in the Baltic Sea were supposed to be in the focus, but not exclusively. A building in Kitzeberg on the eastern shore of Kiel Fjord was provided. Remane was director of the IfM from 1937 to 1944. The marine chemist Hermann Wattenberg (1901-1944) became his successor on May 1, 1944. He perished shortly after the appointment on July 24, 1944, together with eight other members of the institute, when bombs destroyed the institute’s building during World War II.

After the end of the war in 1945, work at the IfM already started again in 1946.Georg Wüst (1890-1977) became Professor of Oceanography and Meteorology at the CAU and Director of the IfM. He had been a scientific leader at the former Institute and Museum of Marine Sciences at Berlin University (in German: “Institut und Museum für Meereskunde (Berlin)“  and had mostly performed research on the circulation of water masses in the global ocean and in particular in the deep Atlantic. In Kiel he succeeded in retrieving several earlier members of the institute, getting the permission to use an old villa on the western shore of Kiel as an institute’s building, obtaining the research cutter “Südfall“ and restarting educational programs. He began research work in the Baltic Sea with a total staff of 15.

After Wüst’s retirement Günter Dietrich (1911-1972) became his successor. He had been a student at the University of Berlin and had also studied the circulation of water masses in the Atlantic Ocean with Georg Wüst and Albert Defant at the former Berlin institute. Wüst’s and Dietrich’s experience in deep ocean studies strengthened the orientation of the IfM work towards the open and deep ocean, in particular in physical and chemical oceanography. The IfM became the leading marine research institution in West Germany during those years, carrying on the scientific legacy of the former Berlin institute in research and education. Technically, the successor of the earlier Museum of Marine Sciences in Berlin today is the German Museum of Technology in Berlin.

An important milestone in the IfM’s development was the commission of the new research vessel Meteor (Schiff, 1964), operated jointly by the German Hydrographic Office (see Federal Maritime and Hydrographic Agency of Germany) and the German Research Foundation (see Deutsche Forschungsgemeinschaft. The ship was used by all interested research groups in Germany. The first major expedition 1964/65 to the Red Sea and Indian Ocean was part of the International Indian Ocean Expedition. The German contribution was led by Günter Dietrich and Eugen Seibold, both from Kiel University, and the majority of scientists and technicians were based in Kiel. This expedition was the restart of deep-sea oceanography in Kiel.

The financial needs of the IfM were increasing with its tasks and number of personnel, having increased to 124 in the year 1968. In order to obtain additional funding from the federal and other state governments, the IfM joined the group of “blue list” research institutions (see Leibniz Association in 1968. New statutes introduced a collegial system, with the acting director being elected for two-year terms by a panel composed of department heads and employee representatives. Although the funding was no longer related to the university budget, strong ties to the CAU prevailed. Professors were selected jointly by the IfM and the CAU.

During the following years the IfM became partner in a considerable number of international research programs. A relevant number of IfM scientists worked at foreign research institutions for extended time periods, primarily in the USA. Later a large number of foreign investigators joined the IfM as visiting scientists. The number of employees was increasing steadily.

In the meantime marine geology and geophysics groups had developed parallel to the IfM groups at the CAU. Parts of these activities were combined in the new geoscience institute “Geomar” established in 1987. At the end of 2001 Geomar had 153 members of staff. The staff of the IfM had increased to 252 by that time. With the aim of achieving an increasing collaboration of marine disciplines in Kiel, the “IfM” and “Geomar” joined organizationally to form “IFM-GEOMAR” as part of the “Leibniz Association” on January 1, 2004. The new institution had 389 members of staff at its beginning. Due to fiscal considerations, IFM-GEOMAR was transferred to an institution of the Helmholtz Association of German Research Centres on January 1, 2004, thus being primarily funded by the federal government. The name changed to GEOMAR Helmholtz Centre for Ocean Research Kiel.

Acting directors of the IfM

Structure of the IfM according to the statutes introduced on May 3, 1968

Research Vessels of the IfM

In addition to Kiel vessels, the IfM staff frequently used all of the larger research ships available in Germany:Meteor (Schiff, 1964), Meteor (Schiff, 1986), Planet (Schiff, 1967), Sonne (Schiff, 1969), Polarstern (Schiff), Maria S. Merian (Schiff)).

Participation in major research programs

The “German Research Foundation” (Deutsche Forschungsgemeinschaft) supported long-term special research programs (SFBs). IfM scientists participated in several of these SFBs, often in a leadership function:

The participation of the IfM in international research programs was of major importance. Among those programs were:

ICES Overflow ’73 

ICES International Overflow Expedition 1960 

International Indian Ocean Expedition, IIOE 

Joint Air Sea Interaction Study, JASIN 

BALTIC 75 Experiment

Global Atmospheric Research Program, GARP

GARP Atlantic Tropical Experiment, GATE

First International Biomass Experiment, FIBEX, 1980/81

Joint Global Ocean Flux Study, JGOFS

World Ocean Circulation Experiment, WOCE

Publications

Web references

References

Oceanography
Oceanographic organizations
Research institutes in Germany
University of Kiel
Science and technology in Germany